Alireza Emamifar (born 16 September 1974) is an Iranian football coach and retired player. He is currently assistant coach of the Iran national under-23 team. He played as a midfielder.

Career
Emamifar played three seasons with R. Charleroi S.C. in the Belgian First Division.

Honours
Persepolis
Iranian Football League (4): 1995–96, 1996–97, 1998–99, 1999–00
Hazfi Cup (1): 1998–99

Fajr Sepasi
Hazfi Cup (1): 2000–01

References

External links

1974 births
Living people
Iranian footballers
Iran international footballers
2000 AFC Asian Cup players
Persepolis F.C. players
R. Charleroi S.C. players
Belgian Pro League players
Iranian expatriate footballers
Persepolis F.C. non-playing staff
Association football midfielders
Iranian expatriate sportspeople in Belgium
People from Shiraz
Sportspeople from Fars province
Bargh Shiraz F.C. managers